The Larson Site is a prehistoric archaeological site in Fulton County, Illinois, near the city of Lewistown. The site was the location of a Mississippian town and was occupied during the 13th and 14th centuries. The town was one of seven major town sites in the central Illinois River valley and served as a social and economic center for surrounding villages and farms. The artifacts uncovered at the site have been well-preserved and include both organic remains and intact homes, providing significant archaeological evidence regarding the Mississippian way of life.

The site was added to the National Register of Historic Places on November 21, 1978.

References

Archaeological sites on the National Register of Historic Places in Illinois
National Register of Historic Places in Fulton County, Illinois
Middle Mississippian culture